Giorgio Mazzon (born 4 September 1960) is an English former professional footballer who played for Cheshunt, Hertford Town, Tottenham Hotspur and Aldershot.

Football career
Mazzon a central defender joined Tottenham from non-league Hertford Town in April 1979 having previously made one appearance for Cheshunt in February 1978 against Epping Town. He played a total of seven games for the White Hart Lane club including three as substitute in all competitions. He featured in one match of the 1980-81 FA Cup run in the 6th round tie against Exeter City. Mazzon told The Big Match TV crew to use 'Giorgio' instead of 'George' in the team line up when it was broadcast.   He transferred to Aldershot in August 1983 and made 195 appearances including 11 as sub and scoring six goals between 1983–88 before being seriously injured in a car accident  which ended his career.

References

1960 births
Living people
People from Waltham Cross
English Football League players
English footballers
Cheshunt F.C. players
Tottenham Hotspur F.C. players
Aldershot F.C. players
Hertford Town F.C. players
Association football central defenders